Botch, Botched or Botcher may refer to:

 Botch (professional wrestling), a slang term for missing a scripted wrestling move
 Botch (band), an American mathcore band
 Botched (film), a 2007 horror film
 Botched (TV series), an American reality TV series
 Botched by Nature, a spin-off TV series
 Di Botcher, Welsh actress